Gaotaizi (高台子镇) may refer to the following locations in China:

 Gaotaizi, Heilongjiang, in Datong District, Daqing
 Gaotaizi, Benxi, in Mingshan District, Benxi, Liaoning
 Gaotaizi, Jinzhou, in Yi County, Liaoning
 Gaotaizi, Xinmin, Liaoning
 Gaotaizizhen Subdistrict, Datong District, Daqing, Heilongjiang